South Colonie Central School District is a public school district located mostly in the Town of Colonie, New York.  It has enrollment of 4,847 students in grades PreK–12 in 8 schools and a student to teacher ratio of 13:1. Its graduation rate is 91%. The district, sandwiched between Albany and Schenectady, is primarily suburban. The area urbanized over the years, with rural land and farms very sparse within district boundaries. It is relatively unique amongst peer school districts because it sends all fifth and sixth graders to middle school.

Schools 
The district contains five elementary schools (Kindergarten-4th grade). 5th-8th-grade students attend one of two middle schools, while the high school serves grades 9-12.  Alternative education options are available for district middle and high school students who are not thriving in the traditional classroom setting. These include computer-based learning at two non-school buildings within district boundaries.
Colonie Central High School (Raiders)
Sand Creek Middle School (Raiders)
(feeder schools: Shaker Rd. Elem., Roessleville Elem., Forest Park Elem.)

Lisha Kill Middle School (Raiders)
(feeder schools: Saddlewood Elem., Veeder Elem.)

Shaker Road Elementary School (Turtles) 
Roessleville Elementary School (Dyno-Rhinos)
Forest Park Elementary School (Falcons)
Saddlewood Elementary School (Stars)
Veeder Elementary School (Owls)
 Capital Region Career & Technical School (Vocational programs managed by BOCES, not South Colonie)

Former schools
Colonie Village School
Central Av. @ Locust Pk.
Roessleville Elementary/High
Central Av. @ McNutt Av.
Maywood Elementary
Central Av. @ Culver Av.
F D Roosevelt Elementary
Central Av. @ N. Lansing Rd.
Lansing School

Board of Education
As of 2018-2019 school year

 Ed Sim, President
 Rose Gigliello, Vice President
 Jamie Blot
 Brian Casey
 Stephanie Cogan
 Colleen Gizzi
 Neil Johanning
 David Kiehle
 James “Tim” Ryan

References

External links
South Colonie Central Schools
South Colonie CSD info on Hometown Locator

School districts in New York (state)